"I Got a Bag of My Own" is a funk song by James Brown. It features an arrangement by Dave Matthews. Released as a single in 1972, it charted #3 R&B and #44 Pop. It also appeared on the album Get on the Good Foot.

References

James Brown songs
Songs written by James Brown
1972 singles